Saint Lide, also known as Elid or Elidius, was a legendary bishop who lived on the island of St Helen's in the Isles of Scilly. The name of the Island of St Helen's is supposed to be a corruption of Lide's name. His feast day is on 8 August and is celebrated on Scilly by the local churches holding a service on St Helen's on a mid-August Sunday.

According to Rev. T. F. Thiselton-Dyer's 1876 British Popular Customs, the first Friday in March is so called from Lide, Anglo-Saxon for March. This day is marked by a seriocomic custom of sending a young lad onto the highest mound or hillock of the work [i.e. tin mine], and allowing him to sleep there as long as he can, the length of his siesta being the measure of the afternoon nap for the tinners throughout the ensuing twelve months.

External links

St Nicholas Russian Orthodox Church St Lide
Scilly Archive History of the Isles of Scilly

Christian saints in unknown century
Bishops of Cornwall
Southwestern Brythonic saints
History of the Isles of Scilly
People from the Isles of Scilly
Year of birth unknown